Lars Bender (born 8 January 1988) is a German footballer who plays as a midfielder for 1. FC Kaan-Marienborn.

Career
Bender made his debut on the professional league level in the 2. Bundesliga for TuS Koblenz on 22 August 2008, when he came on as a substitute in the 67th minute in a game against FSV Frankfurt. On 16 June 2011, he joined Kickers Offenbach.

References

External links
 
 

1988 births
Living people
German footballers
TuS Koblenz players
Kickers Offenbach players
SV Eintracht Trier 05 players
SC Fortuna Köln players
FC Energie Cottbus players
Wuppertaler SV players
1. FC Kaan-Marienborn players
2. Bundesliga players
3. Liga players
Regionalliga players
Oberliga (football) players
Association football midfielders
Sportspeople from Koblenz
Footballers from Rhineland-Palatinate